Pero honestaria, the honest pero, is a species of geometrid moth in the family Geometridae. It is found in North America.

The MONA or Hodges number for Pero honestaria is 6753.

References

Further reading

External links

 

Azelinini
Articles created by Qbugbot
Moths described in 1860